"Stop Me" is the fourth single released off Christon Gray’s The Glory Album. It is the second track on the LP, written by Gray and Chris Shaban and produced by Max Stark.

Background
In July 2015, while in Dallas to play rough cuts off what would become The Glory Album for label heads Kirk Franklin and Ron Hill, Gray met producer Max Stark.  This meeting is documented at the end of the song "50 Shades", where you can hear the first time that Stark and Gray met.

Encouraged to work together by the label, Franklin asked Stark to play some instrumentals for Gray and Shaban.  The first track he played was what would become "Stop Me". Immediately taken back, they both pleaded with Stark to save that for the album.

Two weeks later, at the Flutter Studios in Columbus OH, the three reconvened to work on the song.  Having sent the instrumental early, Gray and Shaban wrote the lyrics a day before Stark arrived. After hearing the direction that the track was taking, Stark added some additional sounds to give it an increased sense of urgency.

The final version of the song was completed in early August 2015.

The official remix under RCA was released September 2016, featuring JGivens. It debuted that same month on Sway in the Morning on SiriusXM Shade45. Notable for the lyrics in the second verse where Gray uses clever word play to showcase the multiple placements the song had received at the time.

Theme
The song is a call for Christians to be more considerate and loving of all people regardless of any prejudice they may feel. This includes "sinners," people of different races, and LGBT individuals. In the first verse, Gray says he is speaking to those in the church and in the Christian hip-hop community.  He calls out judging ‘sinners’ and those who point fingers while covering up what’s really going on in their lives. The second verse is much more direct.  This is a message not just to the church, but to all of America.  He speaks on the history of poor treatment that some black, homosexual, and transgender people have faced in the country. He goes even further to include some Christians as evidenced by the line, “So I apologize, for the Paul disguise, we’ve been wearing without solving the Saul inside." In the last verse, Gray talks about himself. He "turns the mirror around" in an effort to ensure he doesn’t get caught in those same traps. He also references that he has enough things in his life that he needs to change before he can worry about telling others how to live.

References

2016 songs
American hip hop songs
2016 singles